June Yvonne Mendoza, AO, OBE, RP, ROI, HonSWA (born 1924) is an Australian portrait painter, working mainly in oil.

Early life 

June Mendoza was born in Melbourne, Australia. Her parents, John Morton and Dot (née Mendoza), were both musicians, performers and composers in violin and piano respectively, her younger brother Peter Mendoza (born 1927) was an actor most notably with JC Williamsons in Australia and repertory theatre in England. As a child she toured with her mother, working in small mime parts and crowd scenes for the opera, ballet, musicals and revue. During these tours she started sketching in her spare time. 
She realised that art was her calling at age 12 and commenced life classes at 14 and portraiture eventually became her forte. 

In 1960 she married Keith Mackrell, whom she accompanied on two overseas postings, 1960-65 in the Philippines and 1969-73 in Australia. They have 4 children.

Career 

Mendoza's commissions have included portraits of royalty (such as Queen Elizabeth II, Queen Elizabeth The Queen Mother, Diana, Princess of Wales), prime ministers (Margaret Thatcher, John Major, Corazon Aquino, Goh Chok Tong, John Gorton) and other politicians, sports people, military officers and celebrities.

Her works are in a number of collections, including those of Britannia Royal Naval College, Girton College, Cambridge, the Green Howards Regimental Museum, the National Portrait Gallery (three works), the Open University, the Palace of Westminster, Queens' College, Cambridge, the Royal Scots Museum, and Trinity College, Oxford.

She appeared as a castaway on the BBC Radio programme Desert Island Discs on 8 September 1979, and in 1985 painted the presenter, Roy Plomley.

Honours 

She is an Officer of the Order of Australia (AO), Officer of the Order of the British Empire (OBE), and a member of the Royal Institute of Oil Painters (ROI) and of the Royal Society of Portrait Painters (RP). She is an Honorary Vice President of the Britain-Australia Society. She is a Patron of the Tait Memorial Trust, an Australian performing arts charity based in London.

DVD

References

External links 

 
 
 Video in which Mendoza discusses sittings by Queen Elizabeth II
 National Library of Australia

1924 births
People from Melbourne
Australian portrait painters
Australian expatriates in the United Kingdom
Officers of the Order of Australia
Australian Officers of the Order of the British Empire
Living people
20th-century Australian painters
20th-century Australian women artists
21st-century Australian painters
21st-century Australian women artists